Buffalo is a village in Mechanicsburg Township in Sangamon County, Illinois, United States. The population was 503 at the 2010 census. It is part of the Springfield, Illinois Metropolitan Statistical Area.

Geography
Buffalo is located at  (39.851779, -89.409044).

Demographics

As of the census of 2000, there were 491 people, 199 households, and 135 families residing in the village. The racial makeup of the village was 97.56% White, 0.61% Native American, 0.20% Asian, 0.20% from other races, and 1.43% from two or more races. Hispanic or Latino of any race were 1.22% of the population.

There were 199 households, out of which 34.2% had children under the age of 18 living with them, 50.8% were married couples living together, 13.1% had a female householder with no husband present, and 31.7% were non-families. 29.1% of all households were made up of individuals, and 17.1% had someone living alone who was 65 years of age or older. The average household size was 2.47 and the average family size was 3.04.

In the village, the population was spread out, with 27.7% under the age of 18, 8.6% from 18 to 24, 26.9% from 25 to 44, 23.4% from 45 to 64, and 13.4% who were 65 years of age or older. The median age was 36 years. For every 100 females, there were 96.4 males. For every 100 females age 18 and over, there were 90.9 males.

The median income for a household in the village was $36,250, and the median income for a family was $51,250. Males had a median income of $31,641 versus $25,486 for females. The per capita income for the village was $19,637. About 8.7% of families and 10.8% of the population were below the poverty line, including 16.3% of those under age 18 and 10.4% of those age 65 or over.

Schools
Tri-City Community Unit School District 1 - - District website

Library
Tri-City Public Library District - - Library website

References

Villages in Sangamon County, Illinois
Villages in Illinois
Springfield metropolitan area, Illinois